The Armenians in Singapore are a small community who had a significant presence in the early history of Singapore. They were among the earliest merchants to arrive in Singapore were from the British Raj when it was established as a trading port by Sir Stamford Raffles in 1819. They numbered around 100 individuals at their peak in the early 1920s, but most have moved on to other countries or become absorbed into the wider Singapore community. Despite their small number, they had an impact in the commercial life of early Singapore and members of the community co-founded the newspaper The Straits Times and built the Raffles Hotel. The Armenian Apostolic Church of St Gregory the Illuminator on Armenian Street, the second church to be built in Singapore, is today the oldest surviving one.

History
For many the Armenians predominantly came to Singapore during the British Raj.

Early history
The early Armenians of Singapore had their origin in Julfa, whose population were deported to Isfahan (forming New Julfa) by Shah Abbas of Persia after he captured the city in 1603. Some of these Armenians that became merchants would migrate to British Raj India and further beyond and by the 18th century, Armenian traders had established themselves in British Raj India (particularly Kolkata), Myanmar, the Malay Peninsula (particularly Penang and Malacca) and Java. Soon after Sir Stamford Raffles founded Singapore as a trading port in 1819, Armenian merchants arrived in Singapore. The first census of Singapore in 1824 showed 16 Armenians and the 1826 census showed that there were 16 male and 3 female Armenians in Singapore.

Although small in number, the Armenians were active in the commercial activity of early Singapore. Armenian trading firms such as  Sarkies and Moses (1840–1914), Apcar & Stephens (1826–1845) and Mackertich M. Moses (1820s–1839) were prominent in Singapore's economy. By the 1830s, Armenian merchants began investing in land. In March 1836 the Church of St Gregory the Illuminator was consecrated, making it the second church in Singapore.

Some Ottoman Armenians  also came as refugees after the Hamidian massacres and the Armenian genocide killed millions of Armenians.

There were around a hundred individuals in the early 1920s but the number declined. The 1931 census showed 81 Armenians, although actual numbers were around 95. Many of the Armenians, being British subjects, were forcibly interned by the Japanese during World War II. By the 1950s, much of the local Armenian community had emigrated to Australia or become part of the larger communities in Singapore. Nevertheless, during the Feast of the Epiphany, the flags of Singapore and Armenia are still raised at the Armenian church.

Armenians today
The Armenian community in Singapore remains small.  There are around a dozen families in Singapore who are descended from the early immigrant families: Aviet, Carapiet, Galestin, Galistan, Johannes, Moses, Sarkies, and Zechariah.   In the 2000s, some Armenians have emigrated from Armenia to Singapore.

Notable Armenians

Catchick Moses (Movessian) (1812-1895), was a co-founder of the Straits Times, which was to become the national English newspaper, in 1845. He sold the paper a year later because it was unprofitable.

The Sarkies brothers (Martin, Tigran, Aviet and Arshak) founded the Raffles Hotel and several other hotels in Southeast Asia, including Eastern Oriental Hotel in Penang, Malaysia and Strand Hotel in Yangon, Myanmar (previously known as Rangoon, Burma).

The brothers' cousin Arathoon Sarkies managed the Adelphi Hotel. Sarkies Road is named after his wife Regina Sarkies (née Carapiet). Their direct descendants still reside in Singapore.

Martyrose Arathoon who became a partner in Sarkies Brothers in 1917 managed Raffles Hotel during its halcyon days of the 1920s.

Agnes Joaquim (Hovakimian) born in Singapore on 7 April 1854, hybridised the orchid named  Vanda Miss Joaquim by Henry Ridley. In 1899 at a flower show, Agnes unveiled the Vanda Miss Joaquim for the first time, and won the $12 first prize for her flower. As she was suffering from cancer at that time, Agnes died 3 months later at the same year, at the age of 44. In 1981, the Vanda Miss Joaquim was designated Singapore's national flower. Her tombstone stands in the Armenian Church in Singapore and reads: 

Agnes' younger brother Joaquim P. Joaquim (1856-1902) became one of Singapore's most prominent criminal lawyers. He served as president of the Municipal Council, member of the Legislative Council, and Vice-Consul for the USA.

George Seth, born in 1877 was Solicitor-General of the Straits Settlements in the 1920s.

Emile Galistan, born 1881 was domiciled in Singapore. Galistan owned an extensive collection of orchids and was master at growing them, and he freely shared his knowledge of growing orchids with his regular contributions of articles to the Malayan Orchid Review, the journal of the Malayan Orchid Society that was founded in 1931. He was elected an honorary member of the Society in 1958. Galistan Avenue in Singapore was named after, which recognizes the work of Emile Galistan of the Singapore Improvement Trust.

Armenian expatriates in Singapore include Ashot Nadanian, who has coached the Singapore National Chess Team since 2005 and Gevorg Sargsyan, conductor of Singapore Camerata Chamber Orchestra and Tanglewood Music School since 2008.

See also 
Armenia–Singapore relations
Armenian Church, Singapore

References

Wright, Nadia H. (2003) Respected citizens: The History Of Armenians In Singapore And Malaysia. Melbourne: Amassia Publishing.

External links
Ammasia Publishing
The Armenian Apostolic Church of St Gregory the Illuminator

Singapore
Armenians
Eastern Christianity in Singapore